Mitchell Daniel Mallia (born 22 March 1992) is a former Australian professional soccer player who last played for  Blacktown City.

Playing career

Club

Central Coast Mariners
On 31 January 2010 he made his first team debut for the Mariners in a 3–1 loss against Perth Glory, becoming the youngest player to represent the Mariners in the A-League.

Sydney FC
In 2011, after he was told he wasn't in the plans of Central Coast manager Graham Arnold, Mallia moved to Sydney FC to take up a contract in their National Youth League setup. After an impressive start to the youth season where he was the leading goalscorer, Sydney FC manager Vítězslav Lavička gave Mallia his first Sydney FC senior appearance on 17 December 2011 against Newcastle Jets where he would then go on to make 6 appearances in the 2011–12 A-League season. Mallia scored his first senior goal for Sydney FC on 19 February 2012 against Adelaide United in his team's 2–1 win at Hindmarsh Stadium. After impressing throughout the season, Mallia signed his first senior contract on 21 January 2012, sealing a two-year deal with Sydney FC along with fellow youngsters from the youth league team Daniel Petkovski and Hagi Gligor.

Blacktown City
In 2014, after the end of his contract with Sydney FC, Mallia signed with NPL NSW club Blacktown City.

Mallia scored a first half hat-trick on the opening match day of the 2015 National Premier Leagues NSW Men's 1 season against Sydney United in their 3–2 victory.

Perth Glory
Following Joel Chianese being sidelined with a collar bone injury, Perth Glory signed Mallia on an injury replacement contract on 11 October 2017. After Chianese's recovery from his injury, Mallia was released from the club.

Retirement
After spending nearly 5 years playing in the 2nd tier of Australian football, Mallia chose to retire before the start of the 2023 NPL NSW season due to continuous injuries.

International career
On 7 March 2011 he was selected to represent the Australia Olympic football team in an Asian Olympic Qualifier match against Iraq. He is also eligible to play for the Malta national football team.

In March 2018, Mallia was called up to the Maltese squad for two friendly matches, but never made an appearance.

Career statistics

Honours

Club
Marconi Stallions
 Waratah Cup: 2010

Blacktown City
 National Premier Leagues: 2015
 National Premier Leagues NSW Championship: 2014, 2016
 National Premier Leagues NSW Premiership: 2015
 Waratah Cup: 2014

References

External links
 

1992 births
Living people
Australian soccer players
Australia youth international soccer players
Australian people of Maltese descent
A-League Men players
Central Coast Mariners FC players
Sydney FC players
Blacktown City FC players
Perth Glory FC players
Association football forwards